Suat Usta (born 3 August 1981) is a former footballer. who played as a  centre back. Born in the Netherlands, he represented Turkey at youth international levels.

Career
Formerly, he played for FC Eindhoven, MVV Maastricht, Galatasaray, Antalyaspor, Sakaryaspor, Çaykur Rizespor and Fortuna Sittard.

External links
 Profile at Voetbal International

1981 births
Living people
Footballers from Maastricht
Dutch people of Turkish descent
Dutch footballers
Turkish footballers
Turkish expatriate footballers
Süper Lig players
Eredivisie players
Eerste Divisie players
PSV Eindhoven players
Galatasaray S.K. footballers
Antalyaspor footballers
Sakaryaspor footballers
Çaykur Rizespor footballers
Fortuna Sittard players
Dutch expatriate footballers
Expatriate footballers in Azerbaijan
Turkish expatriate sportspeople in Azerbaijan
Dutch expatriate sportspeople in Azerbaijan
Dutch expatriate sportspeople in the Maldives
Turkish expatriate sportspeople in the Maldives
Expatriate footballers in the Maldives
Turkey under-21 international footballers
Turkey youth international footballers
Association football defenders
Neftçi PFK players